The Constitution of Haiti provides for the election of the President, Parliament, and members of local governing bodies.

The current acting president is Ariel Henry, who succeeded acting president Claude Joseph, who in turn assumed office following the assassination of Jovenel Moïse in 2021.

2010-2011 elections

The 2010 presidential election took place on 28 November 2010, with a run-off election taking place on 20 March 2011.

No candidate received a majority of the vote cast in the first-round election. A second round was scheduled for 20 March 2011 with the two highest vote-getters, Mirlande Manigat and Jude Célestin. Protests claiming fraudulent voting resulted in the electoral commission removing Célestin from the race. This promoted Martelly from his original third-place finish in the first-round, to face Manigat in the run-off.

2010 and following
In January 2015, after a series of disputed, unconstitutional, electoral commissions named by President Martelly were rejected by the Parliament, a Provisional Electoral Council was created to plan the presidential and parliamentary elections later in 2015.

References

External links

Adam Carr's Election Archive
International Mission for Monitoring Haitian Elections
IFES Observer Mission in Haiti Photo Gallery
European Union Election Observation Mission to Haiti (in French)